The Thailand Trade and Economic Office is the representative office of Thailand in Taiwan, functioning as a de facto embassy in the absence of diplomatic relations.

It was first established in February 1976 as the Thai Airways International Ltd. Office, before adopting its present name in September 1992. Prior to the establishment of diplomatic relations with the People's Republic of China, Thailand was represented by the Royal Thai Embassy in Taipei.

Its counterpart body in Thailand is the Taipei Economic and Cultural Office in Thailand in Bangkok.

See also
 List of diplomatic missions in Taiwan
 List of diplomatic missions of Thailand

References

External links

Thailand Trade and Economic Office

1976 establishments in Taiwan
Thailand
Diplomatic missions of Thailand
Foreign trade of Thailand
Taiwan–Thailand relations